Marc Aaronson (24 August 1950  – 30 April 1987) was an American astronomer.

Life
Aaronson was born in Los Angeles.

He was educated at the California Institute of Technology, where he received a BS in 1972. He completed his Ph.D. in 1977 at Harvard University with a dissertation on the near-infrared aperture photometry of galaxies. He joined Steward Observatory at the University of Arizona as a postdoctoral research associate in 1977 and became an Associate Professor of Astronomy in 1983.  Aaronson and Jeremy Mould won the George Van Biesbroeck Prize in 1981 and the Newton Lacy Pierce Prize in Astronomy in 1984 from the American Astronomical Society. He was also awarded the Bart J. Bok Prize in 1983 from Harvard University.

His work concentrated on three fields: the determination of the Hubble constant (H0) using the Tully–Fisher relation, the study of carbon rich stars, and the velocity distribution of those stars in dwarf spheroidal galaxies.

Aaronson was one of the first astronomers to attempt to image dark matter using infrared imaging. He imaged infrared halos of unknown matter around galaxies that could be dark matter.

Death
Aaronson died in an accident in the evening hours of 30 April 1987, in the dome of the 4-m Mayall Telescope of the Kitt Peak National Observatory. He was killed when he was crushed by the hatch leading out to the catwalk; the hatch was slammed shut on him by a ladder which extended down from the turning telescope dome. A switch on the hatch automatically shut down the dome rotation motor; however, the momentum of the dome kept it moving for a few moments, allowing it to hit the outward opening hatch. This design flaw was corrected after the accident by trimming the ladder and redesigning the hatch to slide sideways, parallel to the dome wall.

Asteroid 3277 Aaronson is named in his honor.

The Marc Aaronson Memorial Lectureship
The Marc Aaronson Memorial Lectureship, promoting and recognizing excellence in astronomical research, is held every 18 months by the University of Arizona and Steward Observatory as a tribute to his memory.

Lecturers:
 1989 Dr. Robert Kirshner, Harvard University
 1990 Dr. Kenneth C. Freeman, Mount Stromlo/Siding Spring Observatories, Australia
 1992 Dr. John Huchra, Harvard-Smithsonian Center for Astrophysics
 1993 Dr. Nick Scoville, California Institute of Technology
 1994 Dr. Wendy Freedman, The Observatories of the Carnegie Institution of Washington
 1996 Dr. J. Anthony Tyson, Bell Laboratories/Lucent Technologies
 1998 Dr. John C. Mather, NASA Goddard Space Flight Center
 1999 Dr. Bohdan Paczynski, Princeton University
 2001 Dr. Ewine van Dishoeck, Leiden University, The Netherlands
 2002 Dr. Geoffrey W. Marcy, University of California, Berkeley
 2004 Dr. Lyman Page Jr., Princeton University
 2005 Dr. Brian Schmidt, Mt. Stromlo/Siding Spring Observatories, Australia
 2007 Dr. Andrea M. Ghez, University of California, Los Angeles
 2008 Dr. Michael E. Brown, California Institute of Technology
 2010 Dr. J. Davy Kirkpatrick, California Institute of Technology
 2012 Dr. Pieter van Dokkum, Yale University
 2014 Dr. Alice Shapley, University of California, Los Angeles
 2015 Dr. Vasily Belokurov, Institute of Astronomy, Cambridge, UK
 2019 Dr. Jenny Greene, Princeton University

See also

Notes

California Institute of Technology alumni
Harvard Graduate School of Arts and Sciences alumni
University of Arizona staff
1950 births
1987 deaths
20th-century American astronomers
Academics from Los Angeles
Scientists from Los Angeles
Accidental deaths in Arizona